Experiments in Fluids is a scientific, peer-reviewed scientific journal published monthly by Springer Science+Business Media. The journal presents contributions that employ existing experimental techniques to gain an understanding of the underlying flow physics in specific areas. These areas include turbulence, aerodynamics, hydrodynamics, convective heat transfer, combustion, turbomachinery, multi-phase flows, and chemical, biological and geological flows. In addition, papers report on investigations combining experimental and analytical/numerical approaches. The journal also publishes letters and review articles.

Impact factor 
Experiments in Fluids had a 2021 impact factor of 2.787.

Editors 
The editors of the journal are E. K. Longmire (University of Minnesota, USA), C. Tropea (Technical University of Darmstadt, Germany) and J. Westerweel (Laboratory for Aero & Hydrodynamics, Delft University of Technology, Netherlands).

The founding editors are J. H. Whitelaw (Imperial College, United Kingdom) and W. Merzkirch (University of Essen, Germany). Jim Whitelaw served the journal from 1982 until 1999; Wolfgang Merzkirch was with the journal from 1982 until 2002.

References

External links 

Aerodynamics
Combustion
Energy and fuel journals
English-language journals
Fluid dynamics journals
Monthly journals
Publications established in 1983
Springer Science+Business Media academic journals